Løve Apotek (literally "Lion Pharmacy") was the first pharmacy in Copenhagen, Denmark. It opened in 1620 and operated until its closing in 1971, for a total of approximately 350 years. For the entire duration of its existence, it was located at the corner of Amagertorv (No. 33) and Hyskenstræde (No. 1). The most recent building that it occupied was built for the pharmacy in 1908.

History

17th century
Løve Apotek was established by Esaias Fleischer on 12 September 1620 and served as pharmacy for the Danish Royal Court from 1633 to 1715. Esaias Fleischer was married twice, last to Maren Hansdatter, a sister of Hans Nansen's wife. He died in January 1663. In 1650 his pharmacy privilege was made heritable, and his son Gregorius Fleischer inherited the pharmacy. He ran it for fifty years, from 1665 to 1715.

18th century
 
The pharmacy was from 1716  to 1742 owned by Andreas Winter. The pharmacy was then acquired by August Günter. His son ran it until 1790. It was then endowed to his son-in-law, Ludvig Manthey, who had just passed his pharmaceutical exam.

The pharmacy was destroyed in the Copenhagen Fire of 1795. Manthey commissioned Caspar Frederik Harsdorff to designed a new building for the pharmacy and it was already completed the following year.

In 1796, he was also appointed as director of the Royal Porcelain Manufactory.  In 1800. he was sent abroad by the king  to study porcelain manufacturing. Hans Christian Ørsted, his protégé, managed his pharmacy while he was away.

19th century
 
In 1805, Manthey took over the management of Ørholm and Brede Works. He therefore sold  the pharmacy on Amagertorv to Max Boye, who kept it until 1835. His successor, Jørgen Albert Bech, who owned the pharmacy from 1835 to 1859,  was later able to purchase the estates Tårnborg and Kruusesminde at Korsør. The next owner, Harald August Faber, operated the pharmacy until his death in 1873. Niels Nørgaard Aggersborg was the owner from 1877 to 1889. He was succeeded by Paolo Victor Madvig, who owned it until 1904.

20th century
 
August Kongsted and Anton Antons, who acquired the pharmacy in 1908, founded Løvens Kemiske Fabrik (now Leo Pharma) the same year. The company acquired a lot in Hyskenstræde and constructed a production facility.

Managing director Aage Frederiksen was among the residents in 1919.

 
The photographer Frederik Riise operated a photographic studio in the top floor of the building between 1909 and 1913. The photographic studio was from 1914 to 1928 continued by Julius Folkmann.

August Kongsted's son August Julius Helmuth Kongsted took over the pharmacy in 1920. Its production facilities relocated to Brønshøk in  1926 and Ballerup in 1958,

August Julius Helmuth Kongsted died in 1939. The pharmacy was then passed on to  his son-in-law, Ludvig Holtmann, who ran it until it closed in  1971.

Building
The current building at the site was built in 1907–08. It was designed by Victor Nyebøllle og Chr. Brandstrup. A lion relief from Harsdorff's building has been installed above the gate.

Pharmacists
 12.09.1620 - 13.01.1663 Esais Fleischer
 16.06.1665 - xx.04.1715 Gregorius Fleischer
 23.03.1716 - xx.xx.1742 Andreas Winther
 21.04.1742 - xx.xx.1758 August Günther
 13.10.1758 - 13.02.1790 Christopher Günther
 05.08.1791 - 30.06.1805 Johan Georg Ludvig Manthey
 17.07.1805 - xx.xx.1835 Marx Boye
 31.07.1835 - 30.04.1859 Jørgen Albert Bech
 31.05.1859 - xx.12.1873 Harald August Faber
 22.04.1874 - 31.10.1876 Boet efter ovenstående
 12.01.1877 - 31.10.1889 Niels Nørgaard Aggersborg
 01.09.1889 - 31.12.1904 Paolo Victor Madvig
 01.12.1904 - 01.02.1907 Gustav Rink +
 01.12.1904 - xx.xx.1908 Claus Albert Clausen
 30.05.1908 - 18.12.1917 August Julius Helmuth Kongsted+
Ø 30.05.1908 - 11.04.1920 Anton Marius Mathias Christian
                               Antons
 21.10.1920 - 24.04.1939 August Julius Helmuth Kongsted
 06.11.1939 - 30.04.1971 Carl Ludvig Holtmann

References

External links

 Renderings for Harsdorff's building in the Danish National Art Library
 Early Danish pharmaceutical companies

Pharmacies in Copenhagen
Retail companies established in 1620
1620 establishments in Denmark
1971 disestablishments in Denmark
Buildings and structures completed in 1908